Ramil "Bebeng" Gallego (b. September 21, 1966 in Bacolod, Negros Occidental) is a Filipino professional pool player.

As veteran player, Gallego has been competing in tournaments outside the Philippines, mainly in Japan. The Philippine public started to know him very well when he competed in the Motolite International Tournament (won by Francisco Bustamante) and the Rising Stars Tournament (won by Edgar Acaba).

Among the Philippine players, Gallego is capable of speaking Japanese. Thus, he is occasionally being used as a translator when in Japan.

Ramil Gallego, 41, edged Francisco Bustamante, 10-9, in the semis, and defeated Carlo Biado, 11-7, in the finals to win on July 28, 2008, the first P 300,000 Manny Villar Cup Bulacan leg at the Event Center of SM City, Marilao.

Gallego has won a number of tournaments, mostly in Asia. His most notable one is when he won the Bangkok Leg of the 2006 WPA Asian Nine-ball Tour against Au Chi-wai of Hong Kong.

Titles
 2010 Kanto Open 10-Ball
 2010 Okayama Open 9-Ball
 2009 Japan Open 9-Ball
 2009 Hokuriku Open 9-Ball
 2008 All Japan 14.1 Championship
 2008 Manny Villar Cup Tournament 
 2007 Okayama Open 9-Ball
 2006 San Miguel Asian 9-Ball Tour (Thailand leg)
 2006 Hokuriku Open 9-Ball
 2005 Takai Open 9-Ball
 2003 Tohoku Open 9-Ball
 1998 JPBA 9-Ball Festival 
 1998 Takai Open 9-Ball
 1997 Asian 9-Ball Championship

References

External links
"Gallego secures Bangkok crown", Manila Times (online edition), 5 June 2006

Filipino pool players
Living people
1966 births
Sportspeople from Bacolod